Liu Liaoyi (8 January 1915 – May 2001) was a Chinese translator. He was most notable for being one of the main translators into Chinese of the works of the Russian novelist Leo Tolstoy. Douban, a major Chinese book rating site, gave his translation of the novel War and Peace 9.3 out of 10.

Biography
Liu was born in Suixi County, Anhui, in 1915. In 1939 he graduated from Northwest United University, where he majored in Russian language and literature. He started to publish works in 1943. After the founding of the Communist State in 1949, he worked in People's Literature Publishing House as a translator. He was a member of the Central Committee of the China Association for Promoting Democracy.

Personal life
Liu married Wang Rong, the couple had four daughters.

Translations

Award
 Lu Xun Literary Prize – National Outstanding Literary Translation Award (1995)

References

1915 births
2001 deaths
Russian–Chinese translators
20th-century Chinese translators